Super 8 Stories (Super 8 pričа) is a documentary film about the band No Smoking Orchestra.  It is directed by the award-winning Serbian filmmaker Emir Kusturica.  The film won the Silver Plate of best documentary at Chicago International Film Festival in 2001.

Cast
 Aleksandar Balaban .... Tuba
 Zoran Marjanović Čeda .... Drums
 Nenad Gajin Coce .... Guitar
 Goran Markovski Glava .... Bass
 Dražen Janković .... Keyboards
 Nele Karajlić .... Lead singer
 Emir Kusturica .... Guitar
 Stribor Kusturica .... Drums
 Zoran Milošević .... Accordion
 Nenad Petrović .... Saxophone
 Dejan Sparavalo .... Violin
 Joe Strummer .... himself

External links
 
 
 

2001 films
Films directed by Emir Kusturica
Serbian musical films
Serbo-Croatian-language films
Serbian drama films
Documentary films about rock music and musicians
Serbian documentary films
Cultural depictions of Emir Kusturica